Li Jing (born ) is a Chinese female volleyball player. She is part of the China women's national volleyball team.

She participated in the 2014 FIVB Volleyball World Grand Prix.
At club level she played for Zhejiang women's volleyball team in 2014.

References

1991 births
Living people
Chinese women's volleyball players
Place of birth missing (living people)
Asian Games medalists in volleyball
Volleyball players at the 2014 Asian Games
Medalists at the 2014 Asian Games
Asian Games silver medalists for China
Wing spikers
21st-century Chinese women